Kingsley Chinweike Okonkwo, better known as Kcee, is a Nigerian singer and songwriter. He was formerly in the Hip Hop duo group called Kc Presh. He is from Amaputu in Uli in Ihiala local government area in Anambra State Nigeria. He currently has a record deal with Five Star Music. He worked with Del B, a record producer known for producing Kcee's popular song "Limpopo". He is the elder brother to E-money.

Early life and music career
Kcee and his longtime partner and friend Presh played as a duo for 12 years. They met in a church choir, were in the choir together till both entered for the Star Quest TV reality show together and won the show. Their work together as music partners gave them both a few recognition until 2011 when they split, both chasing their own careers quite separately. Kcee released "Sweet Mary J"  which was his first single in 2020.

Endorsements
 Signed a multi millionaire endorsement deal with Tele communications company MTN in 2013
Patience Jonathan appoints Kcee as Peace Ambassador Of The Federal Republic Of Nigeria
Signed a multi millionaire endorsement deal with Tele communications company MTN in 2015
Magnum 2015

Discography

Albums
 Takeover (2013)
 Attention To Detail (2017)

Videography

Awards and nominations

See also
List of Nigerian musicians

Notes

References

Living people
1979 births
Nigerian male singer-songwriters
Nigerian male pop singers
Nigerian hip hop singers
English-language singers from Nigeria
Musicians from Lagos
Igbo singer-songwriters
The Headies winners
21st-century Nigerian male singers